David Peter Pekoske (born May 5, 1955) is an American government official and retired U.S. Coast Guard vice admiral who has served as the seventh administrator of the Transportation Security Administration in the United States Department of Homeland Security (DHS) since 2017. He served as the acting deputy secretary of Homeland Security from April to November 2019 and again from January to June 2021. From January 20, 2021 to February 2, 2021 he served as acting secretary of homeland security, during the Senate confirmation of Alejandro Mayorkas. Pekoske retired with 33 years of active military service in 2010 as the 26th vice commandant of the Coast Guard.

Early life and education

Pekoske was born in Meriden, Connecticut. He earned his Bachelor of Science degree in ocean engineering from the United States Coast Guard Academy in New London, Connecticut. He is a 1989 graduate of the School of International and Public Affairs at Columbia University with a Master of Public Administration degree. Pekoske graduated from the MIT Sloan School of Management with an MBA in 1997.

Career 
Pekoske served as a member of the United States Coast Guard Academy Board of Trustees from 2006 to 2008.

His 33-year career included a variety of operational and staff assignments and command of six Coast Guard operational units. He served on the west, gulf and east coasts of the United States and on the Great Lakes. Pekoske's operational expertise was in the operations ashore community. His staff expertise is in strategic planning, program analysis and budget development.

Pekoske served Executive Assistant to the Commandant from 2001 to 2004. From 1999 to 2001, he commanded Coast Guard Group/Marine Safety Office (now Sector) Long Island Sound, based in New Haven, Connecticut.

Flag assignments
Vice Admiral Pekoske served as Commander, Pacific Area/Coast Guard Defense Forces West in Alameda, California. He oversaw the operation of units performing missions in marine safety, maritime mobility, protection of natural resources, maritime security, homeland security and national defense in an Area of Operations encompassing over  throughout the Pacific Basin and Far East. Prior to that, he was the Assistant Commandant for Operations at Coast Guard Headquarters. From 2004 to 2006 he was Commander of the First Coast Guard District/Maritime Defense Command One headquartered in Boston, Massachusetts.

Vice-commandant
Vice Admiral Pekoske served as vice commandant of the United States Coast Guard from August 7, 2009 to May 24, 2010. As second in command to Admiral Thad Allen and COO, Pekoske executed the commandant's strategic intent, managed internal organizational governance and served as the component acquisition executive.

TSA administrator
On June 5, 2017, President Donald Trump announced that he had nominated Pekoske as the seventh Administrator of the Transportation Security Administration.

On August 3, 2017, Pekoske was confirmed by the United States Senate as the next TSA administrator. On August 10, 2017, he was sworn in as TSA's seventh administrator. On May 6, 2022, Pekoske was nominated to a second five-year term by President Joe Biden. On September 15, 2022, Pekoske was confirmed by the Senate by a 77-18 vote. In the interim, Pekoske reverted to an acting status.

Acting deputy secretary of homeland security 

On April 11, 2019, Pekoske was designated as the senior official performing the duties of the deputy secretary by Acting Secretary of the Department of Homeland Security Kevin McAleenan, making him the acting deputy secretary of the Department of Homeland Security. Pekoske remained the TSA Administrator, but day-to-day operations of TSA were overseen by TSA's acting deputy administrator, Patricia Cogswell.

On November 13, 2019, with the appointment of Ken Cuccinelli as Acting Deputy Secretary, Pekoske returned to his duties as TSA Administrator.

Following Alejandro Mayorkas' confirmation and swearing in as secretary, Pekoske served a second time as acting deputy secretary until the confirmation of the permanent deputy secretary, John Tien.

Acting secretary of homeland security 
From January 20, 2021 to February 2, 2021, Pekoske was appointed acting secretary of homeland security by President Joe Biden, during the Senate confirmation of Alejandro Mayorkas to the role. While he served as acting secretary, the senior official performing the duties of TSA administrator was Darby LaJoye, TSA's executive assistant administrator for security operations.

Awards
His personal decorations include, among others, two awards of the Homeland Security Distinguished Service Medal, Coast Guard Distinguished Service Medal (2), the Legion of Merit (2), the Meritorious Service Medal (5), the Coast Guard Commendation Medal (2), the Coast Guard Achievement Medal (4) and the Commandant's Letter of Commendation Ribbon.

References

External links

|-

|-

|-

|-

1955 births
Biden administration cabinet members
Living people
School of International and Public Affairs, Columbia University alumni
MIT Sloan School of Management alumni
Recipients of the Coast Guard Distinguished Service Medal
Recipients of the Homeland Security Distinguished Service Medal
Recipients of the Legion of Merit
Transportation Security Administration officials
Trump administration personnel
Biden administration personnel
United States Coast Guard admirals
Vice Commandants of the United States Coast Guard
People from Meriden, Connecticut
Military personnel from Connecticut